"Even a worm will turn" is an English language expression used to convey the message that even the meekest or most docile of creatures will retaliate or seek revenge if pushed too far. The phrase was first recorded in a 1546 collection of proverbs by John Heywood, in the form "Treade a worme on the tayle, and it must turne agayne." It was used in William Shakespeare's play Henry VI, Part 3. In the play, the phrase is uttered by Lord Clifford, killer of Rutland as,

References

1546 introductions
Shakespearean phrases
English proverbs